The Battle of Avarayr ( Avarayri čakatamart) was fought on 2 June 451 on the Avarayr Plain in Vaspurakan between a Christian Armenian army under Vardan Mamikonian and Sassanid Persia. It is considered one of the first battles in defense of the Christian faith. Although the Persians were victorious on the battlefield, it was a pyrrhic victory as Avarayr paved the way to the Nvarsak Treaty of 484, which affirmed Armenia's right to practise Christianity freely.

The battle is seen as one of the most significant events in Armenian history. The commander of the Armenian forces, Vardan Mamikonian, is considered a national hero and has been canonized by the Armenian Apostolic Church.

Background

The Kingdom of Armenia under the Arsacid dynasty of Armenia was the first nation to officially convert to Christianity, in 301 under Tiridates III. In 428, Armenian nobles petitioned Bahram V to depose Artaxias IV (Artashir IV). As a result, the country became a Sassanid dependency with a Sassanid governor. The Armenian nobles initially welcomed Persian rule, provided they were allowed to practise Christianity; but Yazdegerd II, concerned that the Armenian Church was hierarchically dependent on the Latin- and Greek-speaking Christian Church (aligned with Rome and Constantinople rather than the Aramaic-speaking and Persian-backed Church of the East) tried to compel the Armenian Church to abandon Rome and Byzantium in favour of the Church of the East or simply convert to Zoroastrianism. He summoned the leading Armenian nobles to Ctesiphon, and pressured them into cutting their ties with the Orthodox Church as he had intended. Yazdegerd II himself was a Zoroastrian rather than a Christian, and his concern was not religious but securing political loyalty.

According to Armenian tradition, attempts at demolishing churches and building fire-temples were made and a number of Zoroastrian magi were sent, with Persian military backing, to replace Armenian clergy and suppress Christianity.

But Yazdegerd's policy provoked, rather than forestalled, a Christian rebellion in Armenia. When news about the compulsion of the nobles reached Armenia, a mass revolt broke out; on their return, the nobility, led by Vardan Mamikonian, joined the rebels. Yazdegerd II, hearing the news, gathered a massive army to attack Armenia. Vardan Mamikonian sent to Constantinople for aid, as he had good personal relations with Theodosius II, who had made him a general, and he was after all fighting to remain in the Orthodox Church; but this assistance did not arrive in time.

Battle

The 66,000-strong Armenian army took Holy Communion before the battle. The army was a popular uprising, rather than a professional force, but the Armenian nobility who led it and their respective retinues were accomplished soldiers, many of them veterans of the Sassanid dynasty's wars with Rome and the nomads of Central Asia. The Armenians were allowed to maintain a core of their national army led by a supreme commander (sparapet) who was traditionally of the Mamikonian noble family. The Armenian cavalry was, at the time, practically an elite force greatly appreciated as a tactical ally by both Persia and Byzantium. In this particular case, both officers and men were additionally motivated by a desire to save their religion and their way of life. The Persian army, said to be three times larger, included war elephants and the famous Savārān, or New Immortal, cavalry. Several Armenian noblemen with weaker Christian sympathies, led by Vasak Siuni, went over to the Persians before the battle, and fought on their side; in the battle, Vardan won initial successes, but was eventually slain along with eight of his top officers.

Outcome

Following the victory, Yazdegerd jailed some Armenian priests and nobles and appointed a new governor for Armenia.

The Armenian Church was also unable to send a delegation to the Council of Chalcedon, as it was heavily involved in the war. In the 6th century, the Armenian Church decided not to accept the Council of Chalcedon, instead adhering to Miaphysitism.

Armenian resistance continued in the decades following the battle, led by Vardan's successor and nephew, Vahan Mamikonian. In 484, Sahag Bedros I signed the Nvarsak Treaty, which guaranteed religious freedom to the Christian Armenians and granted a general amnesty with permission to construct new churches. Thus, the Armenians see the Battle of Avarayr as a moral victory; the Feast of St. Vartan and His Companions is considered to be a holy day by Armenians, and is one of the most important national and religious days in Armenia.

See also
Sasanian Armenia
War elephant
Zoroastrianism in Armenia

References

Further reading
Elishe: History of Vardan and the Armenian War, transl. R.W. Thomson, Cambridge, Mass. 1982
Visions Of Ararat: Writings On Armenia By Christopher J. Walker; Page 3
 Dr. Abd al-Husayn Zarrin’kub "Ruzgaran:tarikh-i Iran az aghz ta saqut saltnat Pahlvi" Sukhan, 1999. 
Modern Armenia: People, Nation, State By Gerard J. Libaridian
Vahan Kurkjian - Period of the Marzbans — Battle of Avarair

External links
Battle map
Summary of the battle from A History of Armenia by Vahan M. Kurkjian
St Vartan's life on www.armenianchurch.net
The Vartanank War The interregnum (428–861)

450s conflicts
5th century in Armenia
5th century in Iran
Battles involving Armenia
Battles involving the Sasanian Empire
451
History of West Azerbaijan Province
Christianity in the Sasanian Empire